Loizou or Loϊzou is a Greek patronymic surname meaning "the son of Loizos". Notable people with this surname include:

 Charalampos Loizou (born 1982), Cypriot footballer
 Christiana Loizu (originally Loizou; born 1990), Cypriot singer
 Christoforos Loizou (born 1969), Cypriot footballer
 Giorgos Loizou (born 1990), Cypriot footballer
 Loizos Loizou (born 2003), Cypriot footballer
 Olga Loizou (born 1961), Cypriot swimmer
 Philipos C. Loizou (1965-2012), American professor of engineering

Greek-language surnames